Gibson Kirk Arnold (born October 19, 1968) is an American college basketball player and coach.

Early life and education
Arnold was born in 1968, when his father Frank Arnold was an assistant coach at the University of Oregon. As Frank Arnold later became an assistant at UCLA and was head coach at BYU and Hawaii, Gib Arnold grew up in the Los Angeles, Provo, Utah, and Honolulu, Hawaii areas.

Arnold graduated from Punahou School in 1987, where he was a prep All-American and Hawaii's high school Gatorade Player of the Year. Initially committed to Hawaii, Arnold first attended Arizona State University instead to follow his father, who became assistant coach for the Arizona State Sun Devils. An honor student as a freshman, Arnold left Arizona State to go on a two-year LDS mission to Munich, Germany.

In 1990, Arnold enrolled in Dixie State College, a junior college in St. George, Utah and played his first year of college basketball there. Arnold transferred to UC San Diego in 1991, averaging 3.6 points in 20 games as a sophomore. Retiring from basketball, Arnold transferred to Brigham Young University and graduated in 1994 with a bachelor's degree in business administration. Gib is currently in the process of completing his masters degree in clinical psychology, at Harvard University, in Cambridge.

Coaching career

Assistant coach and junior college head coach (1994–2010)
Arnold began his coaching career as an assistant coach at Provo High School in 1994. In the 1995–96 season, Arnold moved up to the junior college level as assistant coach at Utah Valley State College (now Utah Valley University). The following season, Arnold got his first NCAA Division I coaching job as assistant coach at Loyola Marymount. In the 1998–99 season, Arnold was an assistant coach at Vanderbilt under Jan van Breda Kolff.

In 1999, Arnold followed van Breda Kolff to Pepperdine and remained on staff under Paul Westphal from 2001 to 2003. At Pepperdine, Arnold specialized in coaching defense and recruiting.

From 2003 to 2005, Arnold served as the head coach at the College of Southern Idaho, a junior college in Twin Falls, Idaho where he posted a 57–14 record.

On April 6, 2005, Arnold became an assistant coach at USC under Tim Floyd and remained for the 2009–10 season under new head coach Kevin O'Neill. At USC, Arnold was named as one of the top 25 recruiters in the country by Rivals.com and one of the top 10 assistant coaches in the country by Athlon Sports magazine. Among players he coached at USC included first-round NBA draft picks DeMar DeRozan, Taj Gibson, OJ Mayo, and Nikola Vucevic.

Hawaii (2010–2014)
On March 20, 2010, the University of Hawaii at Manoa named Arnold the 19th head coach of Hawaii Rainbow Warriors basketball. Having inherited a program that had three straight losing seasons, Arnold led Hawaii to a 19–13 record and CIT appearance in his first season. Hawaii made the 2013 CIT and had its best record under Arnold at 20–11 in 2013–14, their first 20 win season in over a decade. Arnold was the quickest Coach Hawaii history to reach 50 wins. His team excelled not only on the court but in the classroom achieving the highest team GPA in school history and scoring a perfect 1000 APR on two occasions during his four year tenure.

On March 7, 2014, during a game at UC Santa Barbara, a fan of the home team ran on the court to confront Arnold after a Hawaii player was whistled for an intentional foul. Hawaii players restrained the fan, who was later arrested.

NCAA violations
On October 28, 2014, days before the start of the 2014–15 season, Hawaii fired Arnold and assistant coach Bradyn Akana during the initial stages of an NCAA investigation.

Hawaii announced self-imposed penalties on May 15, 2015, as a result of seven alleged Level I or Level II NCAA violations and vacated 36 wins in which back-up center Davis Rozitis competed in the previous two seasons, due to what Hawaii determined to be improper benefits from a booster. Assistant Coach Brandyn Akana was found to have altered information on an internal document for an incoming international student athlete and to have given an iPad to a student athlete as a Christmas gift. The NCAA investigation showed that Arnold had no knowledge of the violations. The NCAA determined that back-up center and Hawaii Scholar Athlete of the Year Davis Rozitis borrowed a car of an acquaintance to move his belongings into his dorm. NCAA records show that Rozitis borrowed the car from the booster's girlfriend as the booster was on the mainland. At first the University of Hawaii compliance director believed that the man in question was not a booster and no violation had occurred. Later it was found out he attended an athletic banquet and buying a ticket to the event two years prior triggered booster status. Hawaii reduced scholarships and practice time, placed itself on one-year probation, and paid a $10,000 fine.

On December 23, 2015, the NCAA announced the results of its investigation, which cleared Arnold of any Level I violations. The NCAA dismissed or lessened every allegation against Arnold. Arnold’s Attorney, James Bickerton said that “his client was pleased the NCAA found no level 1 violations—-the most serious of the associations tiers of infractions —-as he had been saying.” Bickerton said the “NCAA accepted Arnold’s testimony on events and rejected the testimony of his main accusers on the factual points he disputed. The NCAA also recognized Arnold was poorly supported by the university’s compliance department.“ 

Hawaii reached a $700,000 settlement with Arnold on October 9, 2015 for firing him without cause.

Personal life
Gib Arnold has four sisters. Gib has five children with his former spouse. As a certified USA Triathlon coach, Gib has completed several Ironman triathlons as well as completing the Boston Marathon in 2019.

Head coaching record

Junior college

College

References

External links
Hawaii athletic department bio

1968 births
Living people
American men's basketball players
Arizona State Sun Devils men's basketball players
Basketball coaches from Hawaii
Basketball players from Hawaii
Boston Celtics personnel
Brigham Young University alumni
College basketball controversies in the United States
College men's basketball head coaches in the United States
Utah Tech Trailblazers men's basketball players
Guards (basketball)
Hawaii Rainbow Warriors basketball coaches
Latter Day Saints from California
Latter Day Saints from Hawaii
Latter Day Saints from Oregon
Loyola Marymount Lions men's basketball coaches
Mormon missionaries in Germany
NCAA sanctions
Pepperdine Waves men's basketball coaches
Punahou School alumni
Southern Idaho Golden Eagles men's basketball coaches
Sportspeople from Eugene, Oregon
UC San Diego Tritons men's basketball players
USC Trojans men's basketball coaches
Utah Valley Wolverines men's basketball coaches
Vanderbilt Commodores men's basketball coaches
Harvard Graduate School of Arts and Sciences alumni